The 1951–52 Sheffield Shield season was the 50th season of the Sheffield Shield, the domestic first-class cricket competition of Australia. New South Wales won the championship.

Table

Statistics

Most Runs
Phil Ridings 533

Most Wickets
Geff Noblet 39

References

Sheffield Shield
Sheffield Shield
Sheffield Shield seasons